Freddy Emmer (23 August 1934 – 24 December 2019) was a Dutch news presenter for NTS and NOS. He was born in Amsterdam. Apart from TV shows, Emmer also published a book with erotic writings.

Emmer died on 24 December 2019 in Amsterdam at the age of 85.

References

External links 

1934 births
2019 deaths
Journalists from Amsterdam
Dutch erotica writers
Mass media people from Amsterdam